This is a list of medalists in the FIS Nordic World Ski Championships in Nordic combined. Bold numbers in brackets denotes record number of victories in corresponding disciplines.

Introduction
This event debuted in 1925. At that time, the athletes competing in Nordic combined competed together with the 18 km athletes and the ski jumpers, so an athlete could conceivably win gold in ski jumping and combined on the same day. This format existed until 1939. From 1950, there were separate races for athletes competing in the combined competition, and there was one individual competition, with three jumps where the best two counted, and a 15 km cross country race. Later, the third jump was abolished. From 1985 onwards, the Gundersen method – named after the former combined athlete Gunder Gundersen, who devised the system – was used, where the points from ski jumping were recalculated into cross country skiing times and the athletes then started with a staggered start, the winning ski jumper starting first. The team event debuted in 1982, the sprint in 1999, and the mass start debuted in 2009 (it was only time when mass start event was held). Also in 2009, the 15 km individual Gundersen was changed to a 10 km individual normal hill event while the 7.5 sprint event was changed to a 10 km individual large hill event with the former involving a single jump from the normal hill while the latter involves a single jump from the large hill. The team sprint event debuted in 2013. In 2021, women Nordic combined skiers debuted at the World Championships with individual competition, consisting of ski jumping normal hill event and a 5 km cross country race. In 2023, there debuted mixed team event which replaced men's team sprint event.

Men's events

10 km individual normal hill
Formerly known as the 18 km/ 15 km Individual Gundersen, this event involved two jumps from the ski jumping normal (or basic) hill. For the FIS Nordic World Ski Championships 2009 in Liberec, the event will involve a single jump from the ski jumping normal hill followed by 10 km of cross country skiing. Any one point difference between competitors in the ski jump represents 4 seconds between them at the start of the cross country part of the competition.

The 10 km individual normal hill is one of only three events held at every FIS Nordic World Ski Championships.

Medal table

4 x 5 km team (3 x 10 km team: 1982–1993)
Prior to 2009, this involved each team member taking two jumps from the ski jumping hill. For each point difference between teams, there is certain time between them at the start of the cross country part of the competition. This point – time difference changed over years. Since the 2009 championships, it involved each team member taking only one jump from the ski jumping hill with the point – time difference being 1 point equals 1.33 seconds. The ski jumping part of this event took place at normal hill at every championships except 2005, 2007, 2009 and 2023 editions when it took place at large hill (in 2011, there were held two separate team events at normal and large hills).

1984 Extra World Championships in Rovaniemi, Finland as the team event was not on the program at the 1984 Winter Olympics in Sarajevo.

Medal table

10 km individual large hill
Formerly the 7.5 km sprint, it was similar to the 15 km Individual Gundersen except competitors have only one jump from the ski jumping large hill (in 1999 – one jump from the ski jumping normal hill) instead of two jumps from the ski jumping normal hill. For the 2009 championships, the event was changed to a single jump from the large hill followed by 10 km of cross country skiing. Any one point difference between competitors in the ski jump represents 4 seconds between them at the start of the cross country part of the competition.

Medal table

10 km mass start
10 km cross country is run first with mass start. The winner receives 120 points with anyone finishing behind them losing 4 points for every second behind the winner. Two jumps from the normal hill are then done, based on distance with the K-points measurement. The winner is the one who earns the most points. This event was held at the 2009 championships only, being replaced by the 4 x 5 km team normal hill event.

Medal table

2 x 7.5 km team sprint large hill
Debuted: 2013. Discontinued: 2021.

Medal table

Women's events

5 km individual normal hill
Debuted: 2021

Medal table

Mixed event

Mixed team normal hill
This event was first held in 2023. Each team consists of four members – two men and two women. Each team member takes one jump from the ski jumping hill with the point – time difference being 1 point equals 1 second. The women's ski legs are 2.5 km each while men ski legs are 5 km each.

Medal table

Medal table
Table updated after the 2023 Championships.

Multiple medalists

Boldface denotes active nordic combined skiers and highest medal count among all nordic combined skiers (including these who not included in these tables) per type.

All events

Individual events

Best performers by country
Here are listed most successful Nordic combined skiers in the history of each medal-winning national team – according to the gold-first ranking system and by total number of World Championships medals (one skier if he holds national records in both categories or few skiers if these national records belongs to different persons). If the total number of medals is identical, the gold, silver and bronze medals are used as tie-breakers (in that order). If all numbers are the same, the skiers get the same placement and are sorted by the alphabetic order.

An asterisk (*) marks athletes who are the only representatives of their respective countries to win a medal.

See also
Nordic combined at the Winter Olympics
List of Olympic medalists in nordic combined
FIS Nordic Combined World Cup

References

https://archive.today/20120731171641/http://www.fis-ski.com/uk/majorevents/fisworldskichampionships/nordicwsc.html
http://sports123.com/nco/index.html

FIS Nordic Combined